Monique Andréas Esoavelomandroso (born 18 August 1945) is a politician from Madagascar. She was born in Fort-Dauphin (now Tôlanaro) in the far south-east of Madagascar and was raised in the west coast city of Tuléar (now Toliara), receiving a religious education in the Lutheran Church. She qualified as a financial auditor after studying in Paris and at the University of Pittsburgh, and has written studies on the demographics of Madagascar. She is married to Manassé Esoavelomandroso, the leader of the Leader Fanilo party.

She served continuously as a minister in Malagasy governments between 1971 and 2004. Her posts have included the ministries of rural animation, finance and economics, population (including managing women's and children's affairs between 1977 and 1993) and budget and decentralisation. President Marc Ravalomanana appointed her as his secretary of state for decentralisation and development of autonomous provinces in 2002. In 2004, she was appointed as the general secretary of the Indian Ocean Commission, in which role she served until 2008.

She was subsequently appointed for a six-year term as Ombudsman for the Republic of Madagascar, with responsibility for representing the interests of Malagasy citizens by investigating and addressing complaints of maladministration or violations of rights. Her appointment was not without controversy, as her marriage to a leading opposition politician prompted concerns about her ability to perform as a neutral mediator.

She has also served as the President of the "Avoty ny Ankizy" (Save the Children) organisation and the Association of Women Treasury Inspectors.

References

1945 births
Living people
People from Anosy
People from Atsimo-Andrefana
Malagasy Lutherans
University of Pittsburgh alumni
Government ministers of Madagascar
20th-century Malagasy women politicians
20th-century Malagasy politicians
21st-century Malagasy women politicians
21st-century Malagasy politicians
Women government ministers of Madagascar